Sir John Edward Tooke,  (born 4 March 1949) is the Head of the School of Life & Medical Sciences at University College, London. He was formerly worked at the Peninsula College of Medicine and Dentistry where he was the Inaugural Dean, and of the Peninsula Medical School which was its first constituent. He was President of the Academy of Medical Sciences from 2011 to 2015.

Career
Tooke graduated in Medicine from St John's College, Oxford in 1974 and went on to become a Wellcome Trust Senior Lecturer in Medicine and Physiology and Honorary Consultant Physician at Charing Cross and Westminster Medical School before moving to the Postgraduate Medical School of the University of Exeter in 1987.  His clinical and research interests are in diabetes and vascular medicine, and he built an internationally recognized research team in these areas at Exeter.  In 1998 he led the bid for the development of the Peninsula Medical School and was appointed its Inaugural Dean in 2000. Tooke also successfully led the bid for the creation of the Peninsula Dental School, of which he was the inaugural Executive Dean until 2009.

In June 2009 it was announced that Tooke would be taking up the position of Vice Provost (Health), Head of the School of Life & Medical Sciences and Head of the Medical School at University College London.

Tooke was elected President of the Academy of Medical Sciences in November 2011. He stood down in December 2015 and was succeeded by Sir Robert Lechler.

MMC Report
Tooke led the inquiry into Modernising Medical Careers (MMC), the new and current post-graduate training structure for medical doctors in the UK. MMC has become extremely unpopular amongst the majority of medical professionals in the UK, and as a result the Government set up an independent inquiry into the situation. Tooke's report strongly criticises the UK Government's handling of the MMC implementation.  The "Tooke report" suggests scrapping MMC and starting with a new system which is based on extensive consultation with medical professional bodies and practitioners. Tooke's report has been uniformly welcomed by the medical establishment, the majority of whom are keen to bury MMC.

Despite the widespread acknowledgement that the Tooke report addresses several flaws in the government's reforms of medical training, the UK Department of Health's response to the Tooke report suggests that the department does not want to see it fully implemented.  The Department's response accepts only a quarter of the Tooke review's recommendations, and attempts to resist the remainder in varying degrees.  This response is regarded as inadequate by many in the UK medical professions.

Honours
Tooke was knighted in the 2007 New Year Honours for Services to Medicine.

References

External links
 Personal Profile at University College London
 copy of the Report of the Independent Inquiry into Modernising Medical Careers (The "Tooke Report")

Living people
1949 births
21st-century English medical doctors
Alumni of St John's College, Oxford
Academics of the University of Exeter
Fellows of the Academy of Medical Sciences (United Kingdom)
Knights Bachelor
Place of birth missing (living people)